Julius Tverijonas (born 14 June 1994) is a Lithuanian tennis player and a member of Lithuania Davis Cup team.
Tverijonas reached his highest singles ranking of No. 776 in the world on ATP circuit on 23 September 2019 and also No. 88 in the world on ITF junior circuit on 13 February 2012.

Personal
Tverijonas played collegiate tennis at George Washington University (2013–2017), compiling a 67–35 record in singles, and was a 2017 Arthur Ashe, Jr. Sports Scholar. After some time on the professional circuit he completed a postgraduate degree at Durham University (2019–2020), where he won the 2019 BUCS Men's Doubles Championships alongside Or Ram-Harel of Israel,  the pair defeating fellow Durham students Henry Patten and Josep Krstanovic in the final.

Future and Challenger finals

Singles: 1 (0–1)

Doubles 4 (1–3)

Davis Cup

Participations: (0–5)

   indicates the outcome of the Davis Cup match followed by the score, date, place of event, the zonal classification and its phase, and the court surface.

References

External links 
 
 
 

Lithuanian male tennis players
Sportspeople from Vilnius
1994 births
Living people
George Washington University alumni
Alumni of Durham University